The Little Polar Bear is a 2005 German animated adventure film. It is a film about a little polar bear who makes friends with other Arctic creatures.

Plot

Lars the little polar bear travels to the Galapagos archipelago, accompanied by his friends Robby the seal and Caruso the penguin. In the tropical paradise, they meet all sorts of strange and funny animals: birds, crabs and turtles. But when scientists attempt to catch Lars and his mysterious new friend, he'll need the help of all of his friends in order to thwart their plans.

Voice cast

References

External links
 

2005 films
2005 animated films
Animated films about penguins
Animated films based on children's books
Films scored by Nick Glennie-Smith
Films scored by Hans Zimmer
Films about polar bears
Films set in the Arctic
Films set on the Galápagos Islands
German animated films
German children's films
German sequel films
2000s German-language films
Warner Bros. films
Warner Bros. animated films
2000s American films
2000s German films